Thomas Buffel (born 19 February 1981) is a Belgian former professional footballer who played as an attacking midfielder or forward. He represented the Belgium national team at international level.

Club career

Early career
Buffel began his career with Belgian sides Daring Ruddervoorde and Cercle Brugge before making a move to the Netherlands.

Buffel played for the Dutch team Feyenoord in the 1999–2000 season, before moving to their feeder team Excelsior Rotterdam from 2000 to 2002. He returned to Feyenoord for the 2002–03 Eredivisie season. He reportedly fell out with then-manager Ruud Gullit in the next season "after refusing to sign a new contract".

Rangers
Buffel moved to the Scottish side Rangers in January 2005 in a £2.3 million, four-and-a-half-year deal. He made his debut in the Scottish Cup coming on as a substitute against Old Firm rivals Celtic in what was to be a 2–1 defeat. However, the season did not end badly for him as he was to play a key role in the 2005 Scottish League Cup Final, where Rangers defeated Motherwell 5–1. He also featured in the Rangers team for the latter part of the season where he would help them to their 51st league title making it a double for his first season with the club. Buffel scored five goals in 18 appearances in all competitions.

Buffel featured in the Champions League and helped Rangers reach the last 16 of the tournament, where they lost to Villarreal 3–3 on aggregate and were knocked out on away goals rule. Across all competitions, he scored seven goals in 38 appearances during the 2005–2006 season mostly playing in the midfield.

In the 2007 January transfer window, German club Hannover 96 expressed an interest in him, with Rangers manager Walter Smith saying Buffel was free to leave. However, the deal fell through when Buffel was unable to agree personal terms with the Bundesliga side. It was announced on 9 February 2007 that Buffel would undergo surgery on a long-term knee injury and would not take any further part in the 2006–07 season. He returned to action on 26 September as a substitute in a Scottish League Cup tie against East Fife. He would go on to make just five appearances in all competitions in his final season at Rangers.

Cercle Brugge
Buffel's Rangers career came to an end when he joined former club Cercle Brugge on 1 July 2008.

Genk
In the 2009 summer transfer window Buffel made a last-minute transfer to KRC Genk as part of a deal between Genk and Cercle Brugge with Jelle Vossen (on loan) and Hans Cornelis moving the opposite way.

In the 2010–11 season he won the Belgian league title with Genk.

His contract was not renewed at the end of the 2017–18 season.

Zulte Waregem
In June 2018, it was announced Buffel would continue his career at Zulte Waregem.

Buffel retired at the end of the 2018–19 season.

International career
Buffel made his debut for Belgium against Andorra in October 2002 in what was to be a 1–0 victory. He has since then gained 35 caps and scored 7 goals. In recent times he has been out of the picture as a player of the Belgium national football team.

Coaching career
Buffel began his coaching career in September 2019, when he was appointed assistant manager to Jacky Mathijssen at the Belgium national U-19 team. In March 2020, Buffel and Mathijssen was promoted to the U-21 national team.

On 3 February 2021, Buffel was also hired as an assistant manager for former club Cercle Brugge under newly appointed manager Yves Vanderhaeghe, next to his job at the national team. However, on 5 October 2021, Buffel decided to leave the position, as he was going to start his Pro License course and he therefore no longer could combine his two jobs.

Personal life
Buffel was married to Stephanie De Buysser, with whom he had twin sons born in November 2013. They married in June 2016, when De Buysser was already suffering from colon cancer. On 26 January 2017, De Buysser died.

Career statistics

Club

International
Scores and results list Belgium's goal tally first, score column indicates score after each Buffel goal.

Honours
Rangers
Scottish Premier League: 2004–05
Scottish League Cup: 2004–05

Genk
Belgian Pro League: 2010–11
Belgian Cup: 2012–13
Belgian Super Cup: 2011

References

External links
 

1981 births
Living people
Flemish sportspeople
Footballers from Bruges
Belgian footballers
Belgium international footballers
Belgium under-21 international footballers
Belgium youth international footballers
Association football midfielders
Cercle Brugge K.S.V. players
Excelsior Rotterdam players
Feyenoord players
Rangers F.C. players
K.R.C. Genk players
S.V. Zulte Waregem players
Eredivisie players
Eerste Divisie players
Scottish Premier League players
Belgian Pro League players
Belgian expatriate footballers
Expatriate footballers in the Netherlands
Expatriate footballers in Scotland